Sarah Orteza Hovden Øvsthus (born ) is a Norwegian weightlifter, who competed in the 53 kg category and represented Norway at international competitions. She competed at the 2015 European Weightlifting Championships and 2016 European Weightlifting Championships.

As an athlete she became Norwegian champion in the standing long jump in 2015. She represents the club Laksevåg TIL.

Major results

References

1994 births
Living people
Sportspeople from Bergen
Norwegian female weightlifters
Place of birth missing (living people)
Norwegian female long jumpers
20th-century Norwegian women
21st-century Norwegian women